Kenya competed at the 1968 Summer Olympics in Mexico City, Mexico. 39 competitors, 36 men and 3 women, took part in 22 events in 4 sports.

Medalists

Gold
 Kipchoge Keino — Athletics, Men's 1500 metres
 Naftali Temu — Athletics, Men's 10000 metres
 Amos Biwott — Athletics, Men's 3000 metre steeplechase

Silver
 Wilson Kiprugut — Athletics, Men's 800 metres
 Kipchoge Keino — Athletics, Men's 5000 metres
 Benjamin Kogo — Athletics, Men's 3000 metre steeplechase
 Daniel Rudisha, Charles Asati, Naftali Bon, and Munyoro Nyamau — Paul Mose; Athletics, Men's 4×400 metre relay

Bronze
 Naftali Temu — Athletics, Men's 5000 metres
 Philip Waruinge — Boxing, Men's Featherweight

Athletics

Boxing

Hockey

Shooting

Three shooters, all men, represented Kenya in 1968.

25 m pistol
 Leonard Bull

50 m rifle, prone
 Dismus Onyiego
 John Harun

See also
1968 in athletics

References

External links
Official Olympic Reports
International Olympic Committee results database

Nations at the 1968 Summer Olympics
1968
1968 in Kenyan sport